Package forwarding, also called Parcel forwarding is an international shipping service offered by shipping companies to international online shoppers who want to do cross-border online shopping. Package forwarding is becoming more and more popular among international shoppers because of the high growth rate of e-commerce websites and shipping limitations of most such websites. Package forwarding service is provided by package forwarders to make cross-border shopping convenient and easy, getting rid of the problems in payment and shipping. A package forwarding service is different from mail forwarding. Mail forwarding refers to the mail in traditional meaning, or magazines or papers that are normally called mail, while package forwarding refers to online purchases or orders that are shipped within a bag or a box.

Reasons
There are several reasons that caused package forwarding service into existence:
 Fast development of online e-commerce shopping.
 The convenient of international checkout with PayPal and others.
 Possibility of shopping from Amazon and eBay from areas where these companies don't ship.
 The needs of shoppers in one country that desire to buy from online retailers from another country.
 Transit safety and insurance features provided by some providers.
 The price differences between domestic stores and international stores.

There are several challenges with cross-border (US retailer) online shopping, and these include shipping and paying for orders. For instance, US online stores are popular worldwide, but some of them only ship to US addresses or their international shipping rates are prohibitive. US package forwarding services help international shoppers with shipping their purchases from the US to their home address or help them place a direct order with the US retailers if they do not have a US billing address.
Since 2010, this (US) model has been emulated internationally and currently there are many countries offering a very similar service to overseas buyers.

The customer usually has the option to instruct the mail forwarding company how, when and where to ship their package and also to pick which shipper to use, e.g. FedEx, DHL, UPS or even USPS. Several companies e.g. ForwardParcel, ForwardVia.com, MyUS, and Shipito, among others, allow customers to consolidate multiple packages into one.

Procedure
A package forwarding service works normally with five steps:
 The shopper first gets a native shipping address (which is the same as the package forwarders warehouse) and a member number (account number) from a package forwarder.
 The shopper places an online order and for the shipping address, uses the native shipping address and the member number (usually presented like a suite number).
 Package forwarders receive the package and register to the shopper and usually provide some sort of storage.
 Shoppers pay the package forwarder for various package handling services and an international shipping fee.
 The package forwarder ships the package out and the shopper receives the package at home.

See also 
 Freight forwarder
 Mail forwarding

References 

Postal systems